Eli Cross may refer to:

Eli Cross (politician), Canadian politician
Eli Cross (director), American pornographic film director
A character in the film The Stunt Man, played by Peter O'Toole

See also
Cross (surname)